Calliostoma selectum, common name the select maurea, is a species of medium-sized sea snail, a marine gastropod mollusc in the family Calliostomatidae, the calliostoma top snails.

Some authors place this taxon in the subgenus Calliostoma (Maurea).

Description
The height of shell varies between 30 mm and 50 mm. The large, conical shell is imperforate. It is solid, but rather thin. Its color is very pale fawn-color, almost white, with elongated brown dots on the spiral riblets. The upper surface has numerous delicate spiral closely granulose riblets, numbering about 10 or 11 on the penultimate whorl, but more numerous on the upper surface of the body whorl because interstitial lirulae are intercalated. On the antepenultimate whorl there are 5, and on earlier whorls 3 granose lirae. On the base of the shell there are distinctly granose concentric lirae in the middle, but toward the periphery the
lirae become smaller, narrower, and less distinctly grained. The spire is conical. Its lateral outlines are concave on the upper part. The apex is acute. The sutures are scarcely discernible until the body whorl is reached. There are 8-9, flat whorls, but the last one is slightly convex above, obtusely angular at the periphery, and somewhat convex beneath. The subrhomboidal aperture is oblique, pearly and iridescent within. The nacre shows by folds the positions of the principal lirae of the outside. The  oblique columella is arcuate, and pearly. The basal and outer lips are crenulated at the edge.

Distribution
 New Zealand

References

External links

Further reading 
 Powell A. W. B., New Zealand Mollusca, William Collins Publishers Ltd, Auckland, New Zealand 1979 

selectum
Gastropods described in 1817